The play-offs of the 2022 Billie Jean King Cup Americas Zone Group II were the final stages of the Group II zonal competition involving teams from the Americas. Using the positions determined in their pools, the seventeen teams faced off to determine their placing in the 2022 Billie Jean King Cup Americas Zone Group II. The top two teams advanced to Billie Jean King Cup Americas Zone Group I.

Promotional play-offs 
The first placed teams of each pool were drawn in head-to-head round. The winners advanced to Group I in 2023.

Dominican Republic vs. Bolivia

Peru vs. Uruguay

5th to 8th play-offs 
The second placed teams of each pool were drawn in head-to-head rounds to find the 5th placed teams.

Bahamas vs. Puerto Rico

Venezuela vs. Honduras

9th to 12th play-offs 
The third placed teams of each pool were drawn in head-to-head rounds to find the 9th placed teams.

El Salvador vs. Aruba

Costa Rica vs. Cuba

13th to 16th play-offs 
The fourth placed teams of each pool were drawn in head-to-head rounds to find the 13th placed teams.

Bermuda vs. Panama

Jamaica vs. U.S. Virgin Islands

Final placements 

References

External links 
 Billie Jean King Cup website

2022 Billie Jean King Cup Americas Zone